Bark Point is an unincorporated community in the town of Clover, Bayfield County, Wisconsin, United States.

References

Unincorporated communities in Bayfield County, Wisconsin
Unincorporated communities in Wisconsin